The Domestic Encyclopaedia; or, A dictionary of facts, and useful knowledge: comprehending a concise view of the latest discoveries, inventions, and improvements, chiefly applicable to rural and domestic economy is a small encyclopedia of the English language, in four volumes, published in London in 1802 by Murray and Highley, and compiled by Anthony Florian Madinger Willich.  While most encyclopedias of the time, such as Encyclopædia Britannica, were printed in quarto, or in the case of Chambers Cyclopædia, even folio, the Domestic Encyclopedia was printed in octavo, 5 1/2 by  inches. There are roughly 500 pages per volume, and 28 plates in total. Volume 4 includes a 70-page supplement and a 33-page index. The subject matter of the encyclopedia centers around domestic and agricultural information, during a time when most people were farmers. Most of the plates show farm equipment.

An American edition was expanded to 5 volumes octavo by James Mease and published in 1803 in Philadelphia by W. Y. Birch and Abraham Small. Roughly 500 pages per volume, and 35 plates total.

A second American edition was condensed to 3 volumes octavo by Thomas Cooper and published in 1821 in Philadelphia by Abraham Small. Roughly 600 pages per volume.

See also
Encyclopedia
Encyclopedists
List of historical encyclopedias

References
Notes

External links

The domestic encyclopaedia; or, A dictionary of facts, and useful knowledge: : comprehending a concise view of the latest discoveries, inventions, and improvements, chiefly applicable to rural and domestic economy London: : Printed for Murray and Highley, 32, Fleet-Street; Vernor and Hood, Poultry; G. Kearsley, Fleet-Street; H.D. Symonds, and Thomas Hurst, Paternoster-Row; and the author., M.DCCCII.
The domestic encyclopaedia; or, A dictionary of facts and useful knowledge,  Philadelphia, W. Y. Birch and A. Small, 1803–1804.  1st American ed.,
The domestic encyclopedia: or A dictionary of facts and useful knowledge chiefly applicable to rural & domestic economy. Philadelphia, A. Small, 1821. 2d American edition, with additions, by Thomas Cooper

English-language encyclopedias
British encyclopedias
American encyclopedias
Reference works in the public domain
1802 non-fiction books
1803 non-fiction books
1821 non-fiction books
19th-century encyclopedias